The Air Kuning Selatan railway station is a Malaysian train station stationed at and named after the town of Air Kuning Selatan, Negeri Sembilan. Prior to the Seremban-Gemas Electrified Double Tracking Project, the station was no longer in operation and was demolished.

Defunct railway stations in Malaysia
Tampin District